The Flintshire Bridge is a cable-stayed bridge spanning the Dee Estuary in North Wales. The bridge links Flint and Connah's Quay to the shore north of the River Dee at the southern end of the Wirral Peninsula. The bridge cost £55million to construct. This cost was met by the then Welsh Office and in the future, maintenance costs are expected to be the responsibility of the local authority Flintshire County Council.

The bridge was officially opened in 1998 by Queen Elizabeth II. It carries part of the A548 road and has been nicknamed 'the bridge to nowhere' as it doesn't link up with the A55 Expressway.

It is the largest asymmetric cable-stayed bridge in the whole of Britain.

Gallery

See also
 List of bridges in Wales

References

External links

Bridges completed in 1997
Road bridges in Wales
Bridges in Flintshire
Cable-stayed bridges in Wales
Bridges across the River Dee, Wales